Záhoří is a municipality and village in Semily District in the Liberec Region of the Czech Republic. It has about 500 inhabitants.

Administrative parts
Villages of Dlouhý, Pipice, Proseč and Smrčí are administrative parts of Záhoří.

References

Villages in Semily District